Fudan International School (复旦大学附属中学国际部, or FDIS) is a public school  affiliated to Fudan University, providing both  primary  school and high school education. It is located in Shanghai, China. It is under co-direction of the Shanghai Education Commission and Fudan University. 
The school was established  in 1950, and the High School started an English language international division in 2006.  The school is a co-educational, college preparatory boarding and day school offering a Western curriculum for expatriate middle and high school students (grades 1 to 12).

Curriculum
The school uses an American-based curriculum, with the added requirement of Chinese as a first foreign language. Students may select another language if they can pass the Intermediate Level HSK test (the Chinese government language test for foreigners, similar to the TOEFL for English language testing). FDIS offers IB for Grades 11–12.

Admissions
The school is open only to those holding a foreign passport or a green card. An ESL program is available.

History
The High School Affiliated to Fudan University (Fudan International School) was founded in 1950 as a common high school directly subordinate to the university and the Ministry of Education.

An international division serving students from Hong Kong and Macao was formed in 1994. In 2002, the mission of this international division was expanded to allow foreign passport holders to study a Chinese curriculum.

FDIS opened in September, 2006 with a 10th grade class of 11 students. As of September 2008 the school enrolls 100 students (56 boys and 44 girls) in grades 6 through 12. All students must be foreign passport holders or hold green cards. Our current student body consists of over 200 students from all around the world.

See also
 High School Affiliated to Fudan University
 International school

External links
Fudan International School
High School Affiliated to Fudan University
Fudan University

American international schools in China
Educational institutions established in 2002
International schools in Shanghai
2002 establishments in China